Cleilton Monteiro da Costa (born 14 October 1998), commonly known as Cleilton Itaitinga or simply Itaitinga, is a Brazilian professional footballer who plays as a forward for Swiss club FC Sion.

Career statistics

Club

Notes

References

1998 births
Living people
Brazilian footballers
Brazilian expatriate footballers
Association football forwards
Sociedade Esportiva Palmeiras players
Esporte Clube Vitória players
Fortaleza Esporte Clube players
FC Sion players
Pau FC players
Swiss Super League players
Ligue 2 players
Expatriate footballers in Switzerland
Expatriate footballers in France
Brazilian expatriate sportspeople in Switzerland
Brazilian expatriate sportspeople in France
Sportspeople from Ceará